Chevalier International Holdings Ltd., is a property developer in Hong Kong.

Companies listed on the Hong Kong Stock Exchange